Lorne Greene's New Wilderness (or just New Wilderness) was a Canadian television nature documentary series debuting 14 September 1982 starring Lorne Greene. The series initially aired on CTV but was syndicated in 80 per cent of the U.S. and 23 foreign countries. It was a follow-up to an earlier, similar 1970s documentary series entitled The Untamed World (later titled The Untamed Frontier).

It was a multiple award-winning wildlife program, number one in its time slot for five years running, and provided stunning photography coupled with a genuine feeling for the subject matter. There were 104 episodes in the series, each 30 minutes long.

Episodes

References

External links

Canadian Communications Foundation: Lorne Greene's New Wilderness

First-run syndicated television shows in Canada
CTV Television Network original programming
1982 Canadian television series debuts
1987 Canadian television series endings
1980s Canadian documentary television series
Nature educational television series